Shawn Eli Findlay (born 3 March 1984) is a West Indies cricketer who played for the West Indies U-19 team in the 2002 U-19 Cricket World Cup in New Zealand.

Career
Findlay never represented the West Indies in a youth international match. On 1 July 2008, Findlay was called up to the West Indies ODI squad for the last two matches of a five match series against Australia that the West Indies had already lost. After scoring 9 on his debut in the fourth ODI, Findlay went on to score 59* in a losing cause in the fifth and final match of the series; according to pundits, Findlay's performance was one of the few positives to come from the West Indies' 5–0 series loss to Australia.

In June 2021, he was selected to take part in the Minor League Cricket tournament in the United States following the players' draft.

References

External links
 

1984 births
Living people
People from Mandeville, Jamaica
West Indies One Day International cricketers
West Indies Twenty20 International cricketers
Jamaican cricketers
Jamaica cricketers
West Indies B cricketers